Mediahuis Noord, formerly known as NDC Mediagroep, is a Dutch publisher of newspapers, magazines, and websites focused on the three northern provinces of the Netherlands: Drenthe, Friesland and Groningen. It is owned by Mediahuis, a Belgian company. Headquarters are in Leeuwarden, other offices are in Groningen and Meppel. In addition to three main provinces, NDC publishes and distributes also in the Kop van Overijssel, Noordoostpolder, and northern Flevoland.

History

1752–1990: Leeuwarder Courant and Friese Pers 
The early history of the Mediahuis Noord starts with the first publication in Leeuwarden of the Leeuwarder Courant by Abraham Ferwerda, on 29 July 1752. After Ferwerda's death, his son-in-law, Doeke Ritske Smeding, took over and led the paper though the French occupation, during which many Dutch papers were shut down by the occupier. Smeding died in 1814; Pieter Koumans Smeding, his cousin, ran the paper until 1854. His heirs owned the newspaper until 1947.

On 1 January 1955 the publishers the Leeuwarder Courant of Leeuwarden the Friese Koerier of Heerenveen, founded as De Koerier on 16 April 1945 as a resistance newspaper, merged to form the Friese Pers. On 1 November 1969, the Friese Koerier was merged into the Leeuwarder Courant.

1988–1990: Nieuwsblad van het Noorden and Hazewinkel 
On 2 June 1988, Joan Nieuwenhuis began publishing the Nieuwsblad van het Noorden in Groningen. Within months of the first publication of the Nieuwsblad, printer Ruurt Hazewinkel took over the publication. His sons continued the operation after him.

In 1977, the Hazewinkel Pers private limited company was founded.

1990–2005: FGDP and Noordelijke Dagblad Combinatie 
On 2 January 1990, the Friese Pers, publishers of the Leeuwarder Counrant, merged with Hazewinkel Pers, publishers of the Nieuwsblad van het Noorden, to form the Fries Gronings Drentse Pers (FGDP). FGDP was renamed Noordelijke Dagblad Combinatie (NDC) on 1 July 1994. .

On 3 January 1994, FGDP bought the newspapers of Wegener in its region, the Drentse Courant and Groninger Dagblad. On 2 April 2002 the Groninger Dagblad, Drentse Courant, and Nieuwsblad van het Noorden were merged into the Dagblad van het Noorden that became the only regional daily of the provinces Groningen and Drenthe. The Leeuwarder Courant continued unchanged in Friesland and was by then the only regional newspaper to have a nonfree competitor in its region, the Christian Friesch Dagblad.

2005–2021: NDC|VBK and NDC Mediagroep 
NDC merged in March 2005 with book publisher Veen Bosch & Keuning (VBK) to form NDC|VBK. On 1 June 2007, the NDC Mediagroep was established as the subsidiary of NDC|VDK that would handle interests in periodicals, radio, and TV. The interest in radio and TV was brief. In late 2012 the VBK book publication activities were spun off. As a result, the NDC|VBK holder company became obsolete and the NDC Mediagroep took the lead.

On 1 July 2013 the Friesch Dagblad, a title owned by the Fryslân Boppe Oranjewoud Foundation, was added to the NDC Mediagroep and FB Oranjewoud became the majority (51%) stakeholder in NDC Mediagroep. Other shares were held by ING Bank (33%) and foundation Je Maintiendrai (16%). On 19 June 2015, when ING Bank exited NDC Mediagroep, FB increased its holdings to 83%, with Je Maintiendrai owning the other 17%.

In June 2017, NDC Mediagroep purchased Boom Nieuwsmedia in Meppel, the subsidiary of Royal Boom that managed newspapers, magazines and websites. The purchase enabled NDC Mediagroep to strengthen its position in South Drenthe and South Friesland and in North Flevoland and North Overijssel. NDC continued to use the name Boom Nieuwsmedia for its publications centered in Meppel until 1 January 2018. The Kop van Overijssel and the North Flevopolder were extensions of NDC's reach.

As a consequence of expensive acquisitions and reorganizations and deteriorating income from subscriptions, sales, and advertisements, NDC Mediagroep reported in February 2020 losing 5.2 million euros over 2017 and 4.8 million over 2018. In September 2020, Mediahuis acquired NDC Mediagroep.

Since 2021: Mediahuis Noord 
In late 2021, the company changed its name to Mediahuis Noord. In January 2022, Mediahuis Noord acquired Hoekstra Krantendruk in Emmeloord. By March 2022, the printing facilities and offices in Emmeloord closed. Hoekstra continued as a brand of Mediahuis Noord Grafisch Bedrijf, the print and graphics subsidiary of Mediahuis Noord, located in Leeuwarden.

Publications

Daily newspapers
 Dagblad van het Noorden
 Leeuwarder Courant
 Friesch Dagblad

Weekly newspapers

Drenthe
 Asser Courant
 Coevorden Huis aan Huis
 Emmen Nu
 Gezinsblad
 Hoogeveensche Courant
 Krant van Midden-Drenthe
 Krant van Hoogeveen
 Meppeler Courant
 Nieuwe Meppeler
 Roder Journaal
 Westervelder
 Wolder Courant
 Zuidoosthoeker

Flevoland
 De Noordoostpolder
 FlevoPost Dronten
 FlevoPost Lelystad

Friesland
 Balkster Courant
 Bolswards Nieuwsblad
 Drachtster Courant
 De Feanster
 Franeker Courant
 Heerenveense Courant
 Huis aan Huis Leeuwarden
 Jouster Courant
 Kollumer Courant
 Nieuwe Dockumer Courant
 Nieuw Ooststellingwerver
 Sneeker Nieuwsblad
 Nieuwsblad Noord-Oost Friesland
 Stellingwerf
 De Woudklank
 Zuid-Friesland

Groningen
 Eemsbode
 Groninger Gezinsbode
 Harener Weekblad
 Hoogezand-Sappemeer-krant
 Kanaalstreek
 Noorderkrant
 Streekblad
 Ter Apeler Courant
 Veendammer
 Westerkwartier

Overijssel
 De Staphorster
 Steenwijker Courant

Websites
 Mensenlinq
 TweeNul

References

External links
Official website

Magazine publishing companies of the Netherlands
Newspaper companies of the Netherlands
Companies based in Friesland
Mass media in Drenthe
Mass media in Friesland
Mass media in Groningen (province)
Mass media in Leeuwarden